The name Doksuri has been used to name two tropical cyclone in the Western Pacific Ocean. The name was submitted by South Korea and means eagle. It replaced the name Nabi, which was retired following the 2005 typhoon season.

Tropical Storm Doksuri (2012) (T1206, 07W, Dindo) – made landfall over Nanshui, Zhuhai, Guangdong, China
Typhoon Doksuri (2017) (T1719, 21W, Maring) – traversed the Northern Philippines and made landfall in Central Vietnam

Pacific typhoon set index articles